Sümber (also Javkhlant) is a sum of Töv Province in Mongolia.

Districts of Töv Province